Monoceros is a constellation on the celestial equator.

Monoceros may also refer to:

 Monoceros (legendary creature), a legendary unicorn-like creature
 Monoceros (album), an Evan Parker jazz album
 Monoceros, a junior synonym for the sea snail genus Chorus
 Monodon monoceros, the binomial name for narwhals